Bowery at Midnight is a 1942 American Monogram Pictures horror film directed by Wallace Fox and starring Bela Lugosi and John Archer. The film was re-released by Astor Pictures in 1949.

Plot
Lugosi plays a psychology professor by day who, secretly and under an assumed name, runs a Bowery soup kitchen by night called the Bowery Friendly Mission. Lugosi's character uses his soup kitchen as a means to recruit members of a criminal gang, of which he is also secretly the head. Throughout the film, one of Lugosi's henchmen, a doctor who seems to be an alcoholic drug addict, alludes to having plans for the corpses of henchmen Lugosi has had killed. Then, at the end of the film, these corpses are revealed to have been restored to life by the doctor. Lugosi's character meets his demise when the doctor leads the unwitting Lugosi into a basement room where the reanimated corpses attack him. Towards the end of the film, the male lead, played by John Archer, appears to be killed and mysteriously reanimated, in which state his girlfriend sees him. Then, in the film's final scene, he appears restored to his former health, and not like a zombie at all, and is about to (or already has) marry his girlfriend.

In one scene, with two policemen talking outside a cinema, a movie poster outside the cinema entrance behind them advertises Bela Lugosi in The Corpse Vanishes, another Lugosi horror film also released in 1942.

Cast
 Bela Lugosi as Professor Brenner, also known as Karl Wagner
 John Archer as Richard Dennison
 Wanda McKay as Judy Malvern
 Tom Neal as Frankie Mills
 Vince Barnett as Charley
 Anna Hope as Mrs. Brenner
 John Berkes as Fingers Dolan
 J. Farrell MacDonald as Capt. Mitchell
 Dave O'Brien as Peter Crawford
 Lucille Vance as Mrs. Malvern
 Lew Kelly as Doc Brooks
 Wheeler Oakman as Stratton
 Ray Miller as Big Man
 Bernard Gorcey as the used clothing shop proprietor

Production
Following The Corpse Vanishes, Monogram Pictures announced it would make two more Bela Lugosi films, Night of Horror and Torment. These projects ended up being replaced by Bowery at Midnight and The Gorilla Strikes (which became The Ape Man).

Filming started on 3 August 1942.

Reception
The Los Angeles Times called it "maybe the farthest fetched of the Bela Lugosi films", adding "but judging from the squeals of the youngsters who made up most of the audience in the afternoon such tales can't simply be brought from too great a distance to please them."

See also
 List of films in the public domain in the United States
 Bela Lugosi filmography

References

External links 

 
 
 
Bowery at Midnight at TCMDB

1940s crime thriller films
1942 horror films
1942 films
American crime thriller films
American horror thriller films
1940s English-language films
Films directed by Wallace Fox
Monogram Pictures films
Articles containing video clips
American black-and-white films
1940s horror thriller films
1940s American films